The 1986 Men's Hockey Champions Trophy was the eighth edition of the Hockey Champions Trophy, an international men's field hockey tournament. It took place from 4 to 11 April 1986 in Karachi, Pakistan.

West Germany won their first title by finishing first in the round-robin tournament. Australia, the defending champions, finished second.

Results

Statistics

Final standings

Goalscorers

External links
Official FIH website

Champions Trophy
Champions Trophy
International field hockey competitions hosted by Pakistan
Champions Trophy (field hockey)
Sport in Karachi
20th century in Karachi
Hockey Champions Trophy